A.B. Imeson (1875 – 28 February 1944) was an English stage and film actor.

Filmography

His first role was playing Satan in the silent film The Picture of Dorian Gray (1916).
 Disraeli (1916)
 Ave Maria (1918)
 The Breed of the Treshams (1920)
 The Harbour Lights (1923)
 Out to Win (1923)
 The Monkey's Paw (1923)
Bonnie Prince Charlie (1923)
 The Virgin Queen (1923)
 I Will Repay (1923)
 The White Shadow (1923)
 What the Butler Saw (1924)
 The Notorious Mrs. Carrick (1924)
 Second to None (1927)
 False Colours (1927) dramatic short film, with Ursula Jeans, directed by Miles Mander in the sound-on-film Phonofilm process
 Spangles (1928)
 The Burgomaster of Stilemonde (1929)
 After the Verdict (1929)

Portrait
The National Portrait Gallery in London, United Kingdom, holds a portrait of Imeson by Alexander Bassano.

References

External links

1875 births
1944 deaths
English male stage actors
English male film actors
English male silent film actors
20th-century English male actors
Male actors from Yorkshire
Actors from Middlesbrough
20th-century British male actors